Pavlica is a village in the municipality of Raška, Serbia. According to the 2002 census, the village has a population of 156 people.

Notable people
Savatije Milošević, Serbian hajduk and Chetnik commander

References

Populated places in Raška District